The eleventh season of the American animated television series SpongeBob SquarePants, created by former marine biologist and animator Stephen Hillenburg, began airing on Nickelodeon in the United States on June 24, 2017, beginning with the episode "Spot Returns"/"The Check-Up", and ended on November 25, 2018 with the half-hour special "Goons on the Moon". The series chronicles the exploits and adventures of the title character and his various friends in the fictional underwater city of Bikini Bottom. The season was executive produced by series creator Hillenburg. The showrunners for this season were Marc Ceccarelli and Vincent Waller, who are also the supervising producers.

The season was first announced on March 3, 2016, along with the tenth season, and premiered on June 24, 2017. A total of 26 half-hour episodes were produced for the season, bringing the number of episodes up to 241. 

The SpongeBob SquarePants: The Complete Eleventh Season DVD was released in region 1 on March 31, 2020 and region 4 on October 7, 2020.

Production
On March 3, 2016, it was announced that the series had been renewed for an eleventh season. As with the previous season, all of the episodes are script-driven, and each season 11 episode is written by only one person with the exceptions of "Krabby Patty Creature Feature", "Bubbletown", and "Squirrel Jelly".

Episodes

The eleventh season of SpongeBob SquarePants consists of 26 episodes, which are ordered below according to Nickelodeon's packaging order, and not their original production or broadcast order.

DVD release 
The DVD boxset for season eleven was released by Paramount Home Entertainment and Nickelodeon in the United States and Canada on March 31, 2020. The DVD release features bonus materials, including the animated short "Plankton's Color Nullifier".

Notes

References

SpongeBob SquarePants seasons
2017 American television seasons
2018 American television seasons